The 2021–22 Hallyburton Johnstone Shield was a 50-over women's cricket competition, the fifth season with the name Hallyburton Johnstone Shield, that took place in New Zealand. It ran from October 2021 to February 2022, with 6 provincial teams taking part. Canterbury Magicians were the defending champions. Wellington Blaze topped the group to qualify for the final, with Otago Sparks qualifying in second. Otago went on to win the competition, beating Wellington by 138 runs in the final.

The tournament ran alongside the 2021–22 Super Smash.

Competition format 
Teams played in a double round-robin in a group of six, therefore playing 10 matches overall. Matches were played using a one day format with 50 overs per side. The top two in the group advanced to the final.

The group worked on a points system with positions being based on the total points. Points were awarded as follows:

Win: 4 points 
Tie: 2 points 
Loss: 0 points.
Abandoned/No Result: 2 points.
Bonus Point: 1 point awarded for run rate in a match being 1.25x that of opponent.

Points table

 advanced to Final

Fixtures
Teams were originally scheduled to play each other twice at the same ground over a weekend. The schedule was rearranged throughout the season, mainly due to local COVID-19 lockdowns affecting the opening rounds of matches due to be played by Northern Districts and Auckland Hearts.

Final

Statistics

Most runs

Source: ESPN Cricinfo

Most wickets

Source: ESPN Cricinfo

References

External links
Series home at ESPN Cricinfo

Hallyburton Johnstone Shield
2021–22 New Zealand cricket season
Hallyburton Johnstone Shield